The Emporia State Hornets baseball team represents Emporia State University in NCAA Division II college baseball. The team participates in the Mid-America Intercollegiate Athletics Association. The teams plays its home games on Glennen Field at Trusler Sports Complex, located just north of the Emporia State campus, and are coached by Seth Wheeler.

History

The second most successful era for ESU baseball was from 1974 to 1987, when the program was coached by former player Dave Bingham, who posted an overall record of 557–270–2, and won eight conference championships. During the 2009 season, the Hornets were the national runners-up, competing in the NCAA Division II College World Series for the second time since joining the NCAA in 1991.

Early history (1949–1957)
The Kansas State Teachers College (KSTC), now Emporia State University, fielded its first baseball team in 1949, which was led by Bob Ives. Ives served two seasons as head coach, compiling a record of 19–9. For the next two seasons, KSTC had two coaches with a record of 19–10, and from 1953 to 1955, KSTC discontinued the program.

In 1956, KSTC had restarted the program with Chuck Sisson serving one season as head coach. After Sisson's season of going 4–4, Joe Pease, KSTC professor and later the athletic director for KSTC, became head coach for one season.

Five coaches in 10 years
From 1958 to 1968, Emporia State had five coaches, two of which were interim coaches. Bill Kerr served as the head coach from 1958 to 1962, and finished with a record of 58–55. After the 1962 season, Kerr left Emporia and took a head coaching job in Kentucky. In February 1963, Richard Niclai succeeded Kerr as head coach. For the one season that Niclai was head coach, his record was 11–8, and following his departure was Larry Ensminger, who led the team for two winning seasons. After the 1965 season, Ensminger left to become the head coach at the University of Texas–Pan American. In 1966, the last year in the Hornets played in the Central Intercollegiate Athletic Conference, Guy Owen served as the interim head coach, finishing the season with a 15–12 record. In 1967, Larry Cochell, an assistant coach at Utah State, took the reign as head coach as the Hornets began competing in their new conference, the Rocky Mountain Athletic Conference. Cochell's first year was a losing season going 16–17, but quickly turn things around in 1968 and 1969, eventually leading the team to their first NAIA World Series appearance in 1969. Cochell left to become the head coach at Creighton in Nebraska after the 1969 season with a combined record of 72–44.

Jack Smitheran (1970–1973)
In 1970, Jack Smitheran, an assistant coach at Arizona State, was selected to replace Cochell. In his first season as head coach, he led the Hornets to their second straight NAIA World Series appearance. In 1972, Smitheran was nominated for NAIA Coach of the Year. After the 1973 season, Smitheran moved to Riverside, California to become the head coach at the University of California, Riverside.

Dave Bingham era (1974–1987)
Under Bingham's leadership, the Hornets won 11 district titles, five regional crowns and eight conference championships. He led ESU to five NAIA World Series appearances and won the national championship in 1978. Bingham was selected NAIA District X Coach of the Year 10 times, NAIA Area III Coach of the Year six times, and was recognized as the national coach of the year in 1976, 1984 and 1987. Until April 25, 2018, Bingham was the all-time winningest coach at Emporia State with 557 wins. Bob Fornelli, current head coach, passed Bingham on April 25, 2018.

|- style=""
|colspan="6" style="text-align:center;"|

Brian Embery era (1988–2003)
Brian Embery, an assistant under Bingham at Emporia State, was selected as the next head coach at Emporia State in 1988 after Bingham left for the University of Kansas. In his first year as head coach, and the team's last season in the Central States Intercollegiate Conference, the Hornets advanced to the NAIA Tournament. In 1993 the Hornets captured the school's first-ever MIAA Championship and participated in the NCAA Division II Tournament for the first time, allowing Embery to be the MIAA Coach of the Year. As a member of the NAIA, Embery led the Hornets to four consecutive NAIA District 10 titles from 1988–91. Embery was named District 10 Coach of the Year four times, and 15 players under his leadership earned All-American status. Embery was also a four time MIAA Coach of the Year award recipient.

|- style=""
|colspan="6" style="text-align:center;"|Independent
|-

|- style=""
|colspan="6" style="text-align:center;"|

Bob Fornelli era (2004–2018)
After Embery resigned at the end of the 2003 season, Bob Fornelli, former Emporia State player under Embery, was named the head coach. Since 2004, Fornelli has taken the Hornets to the NCAA Tournament 12 times, has made 2 World Series appearances and a national runner-up finish in 2009. The Hornets finished the 2006 season by winning the MIAA Regular Season Championship and NCAA Central Region Championship, as well as advancing to the school's first NCAA World Series appearance.

In 2009, the Hornets advanced to the school's first NCAA national championship game in Cary, North Carolina. In 2014 the Hornets won the MIAA Tournament, and earned another trip to the NCAA Tournament.

On April 25, 2018, Fornelli became the winningest head baseball coach in Emporia State history with 558 wins. A week later on May 6, 2018, Fornelli captured his 900th win overall.

On June 4, 2018, local radio station KVOE (AM) reported that Fornelli had accepted the head coaching job at in-state MIAA rival, Pittsburg State University, after 15 seasons at his alma mater. He was formally introduced the next day, June 5.

Seth Wheeler (2019–present) 
On June 15, 2018, Hornet pitcher coach Seth Wheeler was promoted to head coach. Wheeler had been an assistant coach for the Hornets since 2016.

Venue and culture

Stadium
Glennen Field at Trusler Sports Complex opened in 1992. The field was named after Emporia State University President, Robert E. Glennen, who served from 1984 to 1997. In 2009, a new artificial turf was installed to Glennen Field to replace the infield. Glennen Field also received a new scoreboard and an indoor hitting facility during the 2009 season.

School colors

Emporia State's official school colors are black and gold. They have been the colors since the school was founded in 1863, and until recently, the gold was Old gold.

Mascot

Corky the Hornet is Emporia State University's mascot. In 1923 when the Emporia State was named to the Kansas State Teachers College, the athletic teams were known as the "Yaps". Many people were not fond of the name, most notably Emporia State coach, Vic Trusler. Trusler suggested to Cecil Carle of the Emporia Gazette that the university's athletic teams should be called the "Yellow Jackets". However, the name changed to "Hornets" due to the lack of newspaper space.

In 1933, the Teachers College had a student contest where students and staff could design a mascot for the college. Sophomore Paul Edwards, who graduated in 1937, designed Corky. Although hundreds of drawings were submitted, Edwards' Corky, a "human-like" hornet was selected. Corky was published in The Bulletin, the student newspaper for Emporia State University.

Notable alumni
 Don Dennis, middle relief pitcher for the St. Louis Cardinals in the 1960s.
 Roy Evans, pitcher in the Major League Baseball in the 1890s and early 1900s.
 Bob Fornelli, former head coach for the Hornets.
 Homer Woodson Hargiss, football and basketball coach for Emporia State and the University of Kansas.
 Brad Hill, former head baseball coach at Kansas State University.
 Fred Kipp, pitcher in Major League Baseball from 1957 to 1960; played with the Brooklyn/Los Angeles Dodgers and the New York Yankees.
 Steve Shifflett, pitcher for the Kansas City Royals in 1992.
 Fran Welch, long-time coach and athletic director at Emporia State.

References

External links
 

 
American football teams established in 1949
1949 establishments in Kansas